Allie Beth Martin (née Dent; June 28, 1914 – April 11, 1976) was an American librarian, educator, politician, and author. In 1990, she was named one of the 100 most influential people in the field of library science by American Libraries. She was the first director of the Tulsa City-County Library, from 1963 until her death, and was known for her ground-breaking library improvement programs.

Early life
Martin was born in Annieville, Arkansas, on June 28, 1914, to Carleton Gayle Dent and Ethel (McCaleb) Dent. After graduating from high school in 1932, she went on to earn several degrees. She earned a B.A. in foreign languages & English from Arkansas College in 1935 and a B.S. in Library Science in 1939 from Peabody College. She later earned an M.S. in Library Science in 1949 from Columbia University.

She married Ralph F. Martin, a journalist, on October 6, 1937.

Career
Martin began working in a junior college in Little Rock, Arkansas. She joined the Arkansas Library Commission as an assistant to the executive secretary.
She started working at the Tulsa Library in 1949 and became the director of the Tulsa City-County Library in 1963. Later she elected president of committee in 1945 and president of the ALA in 1975. She died in Tulsa on April 11, 1976.

Programs
Funded by the National Endowment for the Humanities and the Council on Library Resources in 1972, Allie Beth Martin prepared a report on whether the library meets the needs of its patrons; the report was published by the Public Library Association (PLA) and the American Library Association (ALA). The plan listed steps that libraries should take in order to transition into the 21st Century and keep up with library's changing roles in society.
After doing the preliminary study, Martin wrote the book A Strategy for Public Library Change, which sparked a movement of library improvement programs all across the country.

Legacy and honors
 She was awarded an honorary Doctorate of Humanities Degree from University of Tulsa.
 The Tulsa Regional Library was named after her as well a lecture series and a national library award.
 The Allie Beth Martin Award has been presented annually since 1979 by the Public Library Association.

References

External links

 Oklahoma State Library Legends

 

Library science scholars
People from Lawrence County, Arkansas
1914 births
1976 deaths
Presidents of the American Library Association
Lyon College alumni
Columbia University School of Library Service alumni
Peabody College alumni
American librarians
American women librarians
Writers from Tulsa, Oklahoma
20th-century American women
20th-century American people